Saint Brandon, also known as the Cargados Carajos Shoals, is an Indian Ocean archipelago about  northeast of Mauritius consisting of sand banks, shoals and islets. It consists of five island groups, with about 28-40 islands and islets in total, depending on seasonal storms and related sand movements.

The archipelago is low-lying and is prone to substantial submersion in severe weather by tropical cyclones in the Mascarene Islands. The islands have a small population of mostly fishermen, numbering 63 people in 2001. The bulk of this population, approximately 40 people, live on Île Raphael, with smaller settlements existing on Avocaré Island, L'Île Coco, and L'île du Sud. 

In the early 19th century, most of the islands were used as fishing stations. Today, only one company operates on the archipelago with three fishing stations and accommodation for sport fishermen on L'île du Sud and Île Raphael. A settlement on Albatross Island was abandoned in 1988. 

The islands are currently the subject of a legal dispute over territorial sovereignty between the government of Mauritius and Raphael Fishing Company, the current leaseholders of the islands.

Etymology 
The name Saint Brandon most likely came from the anglicized name of the French town of Saint-Brandan, possibly given by French sailors and corsairs that sailed to and from Britanny.

Geography

Geographically, the archipelago is part of the Mascarene Islands and is situated on the Mascarene Plateau formed by the separation of the Mauritia microcontinent during the separation of India and Madagascar around 60 million years ago from what is today the African continent.

The total number of islands on the reef varies but usually number around 40.

The climate is dominated by the south-east trades. Cyclones can cause considerable damage. In 1948, Il aux Fous disappeared and Avoquer was submerged by two meters of water. Petit ile Longue was swept away in a later cyclone, but is now reappearing. The South Equatorial Current is dominant.

List of named islands

Ecology
It has one of the largest algal ridges in the Indian Ocean. Coconut trees can be found on a few islands as well as a variety of bushes and grass. The islands are covered with white granular sand from eroded coral, and a thick layer of guano can be found in most places.

The western part of the bay has a coral bank and a fringing reef, dominated by staghorn Acropora, with an irregular front which merges with the coral banks; the reef flat has appreciable coral cover. North of this, or deeper into the bay, are several isolated patches of coral growing in deeper water. 

The eastern border has reefs with a greater diversity of corals, in particular, enormous hillocks of Pavona  with Mycedium tenuicostatum which is unusual in Mauritius. On the sandy substrate, Goniopora and Pontes provide hard substrate for several other species, notably Acropora and Pavona. Large tabular Acropora corals are also conspicuous, and when dead or overturned, provide substrate for other colonizers. These patches have expanded and fused to provide the numerous, large coral banks found in the Bay. Only twenty-eight coral species have been recorded which is probably due to the uniform habitat. Further offshore lies a peripheral fringing reef. 

This complex of low islands, coral reefs and sand banks arises from a vast shallow submarine platform. The reef front of the main reef recurves inwards at both ends and is cut by two or three passes.

The main reef has a very broad reef flat, extending up to several hundred metres across in parts. Together with much of the broad reef flat it is emergent at low tides. Apart from calcareous red algae it supports a few pocilloporoid corals. Down to at least  depth the substrate is swept clear of attached biota, although on the sides of spurs or buttresses a few corals exist. Underwater photographs of some of the numerous knolls and banks behind the reef show that the density of corals and soft corals is typical of many very sedimented areas and shallow lagoons in the Indian Ocean. 

The islands are home to a total of 26 species of seabirds such as blue-faced boobies, sooty terns, and white terns. Green turtles and hawksbill turtles are also found on the islands.

History

The atoll was probably discovered in 975 A.D. by Arabian sailors along with Dina Arobi ("Abandoned Island"), now known as the island of Mauritius.

It was named in 1506 by Portuguese sailors who went ashore for provisioning on their way to India. Pirates and French corsairs have also used the islands as a refuge.

In 1598, the Dutch occupied the islands.

On 12 February 1662, the East India Ship Arnhem ran aground on the Saint Brandon Rocks. Volkert Evertsz, the captain, and other survivors of the wreck survived by piloting a small boat to Mauritius, and are thought to have been the last humans to see living dodos. They survived the three months until their rescue by hunting "goats, birds, tortoises and pigs".  Evertsz was rescued by the English ship Truroe in May 1662. Seven of the survivors chose not to return with the first rescue ship.

Saint Brandon was referred to as Cargados in Samuel Dunn's world map of 1794.

On 9 June 1806, the French general Charles Decaen ordered the corsair Charles Nicolas Mariette to send a spying mission to Saint Brandon and to leave six men on the most prominent island and, on his return trip to Mauritius, to ascertain once and for all that Cargados Carajos and St. Brandon were the same shoal. The frigate Piemontaise under the command of Louis Jacques Eperon le Jeune departed on 11 June 1806.

In 1810, the islands were taken by force by Britain, becoming a British crown colony.

From October to November 1917, the St. Brandon Islands and, in particular, the lagoon of L'Île Coco, were used as a base by the German raiding vessel , commanded by Karl August Nerger. On the island,  transferred stoking coal and stores from the captured Japanese ship  which took three weeks. The coal was necessary for the raider's return to Germany. To do so,  had to run a gauntlet of Allied warships from near the Cape of the Good Hope to the North Atlantic.

The most common employment on St. Brandon in 1922 was agriculture, with a manager, assistant manager and eleven labourers. Only two young men were recorded as working as fishermen. Three men worked as carpenters, one as a mason, one as a shoemaker and another as a domestic servant. There was no indication that the guano mines were operating. The islands were later mined for phosphates derived from guano until mining activities ceased in the mid-20th century.

Shipwrecks
Shipwrecks on the low-lying, rocky reefs of St. Brandon have been recorded since as early as 1662. 

On 12 February 1662, the Dutch East Indiaman sailing ship Arnhem wrecked itself on the rocks at St. Brandon.
1780s -  The English ship, the Hawk, foundered on Saint Brandon on her return to Europe from Surat.

On 25 October 1795, a vessel called l'Euphrasie arrived in Port Louis with five survivors from a shipwreck in St. Brandon related to a corsair ship called La Revanche. A certain crewman called Landier is described as leading this group of survivors. The other eight crew members perished.
On 7 July 1818, the sailing vessel Cabalva, built by Wells, Wigram & Green in 1811 and owned by the East India Company, struck the reef at St. Brandon on its way to China and was destroyed. Captain James Dalrymple and several other lost their life.
On 15 September 1845, the sailing ship Letitia ran aground on the Frigate islet.
On 3 October 1969, the Russian tugboat Argus wrecked itself on the reef at St. Brandon. A total of 38 men were rescued.
In 2012, a tuna longliner ran aground on the reef crest of St. Brandon's atoll. It broke into three pieces which was moved by currents and storms into the lagoon.
On 29 November 2014, during the second leg of the 2014–15 Volvo Ocean Race, the sailing boat Team Vestas Wind ran aground on St. Brandon. 
On 1 February 2015, the fishing vessel Kha Yang, with 250,000 liters of fuel in its tanks, ran aground on the reef of St. Brandon. Its crew of 20 were rescued shortly after its grounding, and a salvage operation pumped the fuel from its tanks a few weeks later. 
On 2 February 2017, the long bulk carrier Alam Manis ran aground on its way to Pipavav from Richards Bay.
On 5 June 2021, the FV Sea Master belonging to the Mauritian company Hassen Taher was shipwrecked on Albatross Island.
On 5 December 2022, the Taiwanese fishing vessel FV Yu Feng 67 ran aground off L'île du Sud.

Demographics 
The main settlement and the administrative centre of St. Brandon is Île Raphaël and can have up to 35 resident employees, a coast guard outpost and meteorological station (with eight residents in 1996). Smaller settlements exist on Avocaré Island, L'Île Coco, and L'île du Sud. The settlement on Albatross was abandoned in 1988.

Historical population 
The St. Brandon archipelago was surveyed by British colonial authorities on 31 March 1911 as part of the Census of Mauritius. They found a total population of 110, made up of 97 men (86 non-Indian and 11 Indian) and 13 women (10 non-Indian and 3 Indian). While the archipelago likely had a resident population at this point, as indicated by the 8 children under the age of 15 and the 5 people over the age of 60, there was also likely a seasonal component, with the largest population segment being men between 20 and 35. 73 men worked in fishing, 11 at the guano mines and 4 were ship's carpenters. Only one (male) person was recorded as having been born on St. Brandon.

In the 1921 census, the population had plummeted to just 22. There were 21 men (ages 19–48) and just one woman, a married Catholic, aged 31. A further 14 people were identified as part of the "general population", with 11 of them born on Mauritius, one on Rodrigues and two in the Seychelles. In addition, there were 3 Indo-Mauritians and 5 "other Indians" from Madras, Calcutta and Colombo.

See also
Mascarene Islands
Île Raphael
Avocaré Island
L'île du Sud
L'île du Gouvernement
L'Île Coco

References

Further reading

External links

Map of Mauritius

Marine Protected Areas by Project Regeneration
Marine Protection Atlas - an online tool from the Marine Conservation Institute that provides information on the world's protected areas and global MPA campaigns. Information comes from a variety of sources, including the World Database on Protected Areas (WDPA), and many regional and national databases.
Marine protected areas - viewable via Protected Planet, an online interactive search engine hosted by the United Nations Environment Programme's World Conservation Monitoring Center (UNEP-WCMC).

 
Outer Islands of Mauritius
Reefs of the Indian Ocean
Fishing areas of the Indian Ocean
Insular ecology
Shipwrecks by continent
Important Bird Areas of Mauritius
Flora of Mauritius
Atolls of the Indian Ocean
Fly fishing
Fishing tournaments
Biodiversity
Ecotoxicology
Shipwrecks by country
Marine reserves
Marine conservation
Protected areas
Oceanography
Fisheries science
Fisheries law
Marine protected areas